Fortify is a verb, meaning to build a fortification. 

Fortify may also refer to:

Computing and technology
 Fortify (Netscape), a software hack for the Netscape Navigator
 Fortify, a software tool used to format programs in the Fortress programming language for rendering by LaTeX 
 Fortify Software, a software code analysis product
 Fortify, an app marketed by the anti-pornography organization Fight the New Drug which tracks the user’s masturbation habits

Other uses
 Fortify, a construction project on Interstate 40 (North Carolina)

See also 
 Fortification (disambiguation)
 Fortified
 Fortress